Petrica Kerempuh is a literary character who appears in a number of Croatian and former Yugoslav works, but is most famous for his appearance in the critically lauded The Ballads of Petrica Kerempuh by Croatian author Miroslav Krleža, who wrote in the Kajkavian dialect. Petrica Kerempuh is a prophet of the people and a cynical commentator on contemporary events. 

The name is derived from the dialectical word kerempuh, meaning "belly" or "abdomen", with a figurative meaning suggesting a person of cunning or a merrymaker. The earliest origins appear to be from Jakob Lovrenčić's printing of the book Petrica Kerempuh iliti čini i življenje človeka prokšenoga ("Petrica Kerempuh or the Life of a Prodigal Man") in 1834, which is a translation of a German book on the travels and adventures of Till Eulenspiegel. In 1936, Krleža published The Ballads of Petrica Kerempuh in Ljubljana and it was received very well. The book went on to be considered an important moment in 20th-century Central European literature, emblematic of the best the region had to offer. Through the character, Krleža voiced his opposition to the centuries-old oppression of the people. Kerempuh is often considered to be a Zagorje version of the original Till Eulenspiegel tales, as well as the Hungarian tales of Mátyás Garabonciás Diák, which was worked on by Tituš Brezovački.

Another example of the character appears in Dragutin Domjanić's little-known "puppet game" Petrica Kerempuh i spametni osel ("Petrica Kerempuh and the Smart Ass"), in which he critically and satirically describes Croatian intellectuals of the 1920s. Apart from being a literary character, Petrica Kerempuh has also come to life in the theater. There is a sculpture of Petrica Kerempuh by the sculptor Vanja Radauš, erected in 1955, located at the Dolac Market in Zagreb. North of Dolac is Petrica Kerempuh's Square, where flowers are sold.

Gallery

Citations

Male characters in literature
Croatian literature
Fictional Croatian people